Everton is a closed station of the closed Bright line. Everton was the former junction station for the Yackandandah line.
Only the platform remains at this station where a new shelter and toilets have been built as part of a rail trail project. A plaque and commemorative buffer stop have also been erected on the platform. 

Disused railway stations in Victoria (Australia)